The UK Rock & Metal Singles Chart and UK Rock & Metal Albums Chart are record charts compiled in the United Kingdom by the Official Charts Company (OCC) to determine the 40 most popular singles and albums in the rock and heavy metal genres. The two charts are compiled by the OCC from digital downloads, physical record sales and audio streams in UK retail outlets. The charts have been published on the official OCC website since 1994. Previously, the UK Rock Singles chart, sometimes called the Metal Singles chart, that was compiled by CIN, which later became OCC, was published in Hit Music from September 1992 intermittently to February 1997 and interchangeably with the Rock and Metal Albums chart (which was sometimes under the title of Rock and Metal Singles chart) and also with the Indie Chart.

See also
List of artists by number of UK Rock & Metal Singles Chart number ones
List of artists by number of UK Rock & Metal Albums Chart number ones

Media Research Information Bureau charts

List of UK Rock & Metal Singles Chart number ones of 1986
List of UK Rock & Metal Singles Chart number ones of 1987
List of UK Rock & Metal Singles Chart number ones of 1988

References

External links
 Official Rock & Metal Singles Chart Top 40 at the Official Charts Company
 Official Rock & Metal Albums Chart Top 40 at the Official Charts Company

British record charts
BBC Radio 1
Rock music mass media
1994 establishments in the United Kingdom